Galesburg is an Amtrak intercity train station in Galesburg, Illinois, United States. The station was originally built in 1984, after the razing of the large depot just south of the current site. It is located north of the large BNSF Classification yard. Just south the Illinois Zephyr and Carl Sandburg diverge via the Quincy main line which bypasses the yard on the east side. The California Zephyr and the Southwest Chief continue to the southwest side of Galesburg near Knox College.

There are three tracks with one island platform and one side platform. Trains to California normally arrive on the track closest to the depot, known as track one. Trains between Quincy and Chicago arrive on track two and platform on the island platform as trains divert from the main line just south of the station and eventually on to the Brookfield Subdivision. In the early 2010s, the island platform received a yellow tactile warning strip that complies with the Americans with Disabilities Act. The project was funded by the American Recovery and Reinvestment Act of 2009 at an estimated cost of $75,000. The side platform already had a tactile warning strip.

It is the main area for Galesburg Railroad Days when it runs during the last weekend of June as bus tours of the rail yards originate from here. A GE Evolution Series locomotive is also put on a side track for visitors to look at. The Galesburg Railroad Museum is next to the property.

History

The Chicago, Burlington & Quincy Railroad was established in 1849 to rival the Galena & Chicago Union Railroad. Five years later, in 1854, the CB&Q reached Galesburg and a depot was constructed in the "Five Points" area, near Knox College. The wooden building had two stories, with offices on the second floor, and was connected to a hotel. In 1858, Stephen A. Douglas traveled through this station on his way to debate future president Abraham Lincoln. On March 3, 1881, the depot fell victim to a fire.

1884 saw the construction of a new CB&Q depot on Seminary Street in Galesburg. The station, unlike the station at Five Points, was made of red brick. The structure was two stories tall, and included a clock tower in the center, with a steam locomotive weather-vane. It also had several platforms and tracks. Soon after the completion of the new depot, the Atchison, Topeka and Santa Fe Railway arrived in Galesburg and a Santa Fe depot was built just blocks away from the CB&Q depot, a depot, which, by the mid-20th century, would see such notable trains as the Super Chief and El Capitan.  Ironically, despite being built of brick, unlike its predecessor, it wound up falling victim to a similar fate almost exactly 30 years later. On May 27, 1911, a fire began in the attic of the building and the structure burned to the ground.

Work began on a third structure soon after, and the building opened the following year. The third depot was 16,000 square feet, of reddish-brown brick and white limestone trim. Extra buildings would be added for freight and restaurants at each end of the main station house. Beginning in the mid-1930s, the CB&Q introduced their famous Zephyr trains this depot became a station on several of the trains, including the Nebraska Zephyr, Ak-Sar-Ben Zephyr and Denver Zephyr. It was also a station on the Exposition Flyer, operated jointly between the CB&Q, Denver & Rio Grande Western and Western Pacific railroads between Chicago and Oakland, a train which would later be replaced by the famed California Zephyr. The depot eventually would serve Burlington Northern trains between 1970 and 1971 and later Amtrak trains post 1971. By the early 1980s, however, Burlington Northern officials began to question the necessity and practicality of having such a large depot in the face of declining passenger service. Following a study that stated that it would cost $1.5 million to renovate the building, the building was demolished overnight on May 13, 1983.

In 1984, a one-story Amtrak station was built with funding split by the passenger railroad and the Illinois Department of Transportation.

Connections
Burlington Trailways (Indianapolis, IN—Burlington, IA)
 Galesburg Transit: Route 2 (Green)

Gallery

References

External links

Galesburg Amtrak Station (USA Rail Guide -- Train Web)

Amtrak stations in Illinois
Galesburg, Illinois
Former Chicago, Burlington and Quincy Railroad stations
Railway stations in the United States opened in 1854
Transportation buildings and structures in Knox County, Illinois
1854 establishments in Illinois